Ibarapa Central is a Local Government Area in Oyo State, Nigeria. The Ibarapa central consist of Igbo-Ora and Idere town. Its headquarter is in the town of Igbo-Ora.

It has an area of 440 km and a population of 102,979 at the 2006 census. In 2018 the population is estimated to be around 322,189 people. 
The local population is almost made up of Ibarapa people Who are in turn, a Yoruba ethnic group.

The postal code of the area is 201.

References

Local Government Areas in Oyo State
Local Government Areas in Yorubaland